Matthew Williams (February 8, 1908 – December 4, 1931) was a black man  lynched by a white mob in Salisbury, Maryland on December 4, 1931.

Early life 
Matthew Williams was born on February 8, 1908, the second and youngest child of Annie Handy and Harry Williams. Following the death of his mother from pneumonia when he was just 4 years old, he and his sister Olivia were sent to live with their maternal grandmother, Mary Handy, in Salisbury, Maryland.

Life in Salisbury, Maryland 
Shortly after starting school in Maryland at the age of 8, Matthew's father died. By age 14, his grandfather also died, forcing Matthew to leave school and seek employment to help the family earn a living. Upon the death of his grandmother, Matthew went to live on Isabella Avenue in the black district of Salisbury with his maternal Aunt, Addie Black, and her husband Thomas Black Sr.; along with his cousins Viola, Thomas Jr. Preston, Edna, and Mary. His Aunt Addie called him "Buddie".

At some point in his teenage years, Matthew Williams went to work for a local white employer - one Mr. Daniel J. Elliott -  who owned a lumberyard and box factory in town. Matthew worked as a laborer in the factory, but also did odd jobs for the Elliott family. According to known accounts, the Elliott family were "quite fond of Williams, and he of them".

In her book, On The Courthouse Lawn, professor and civil rights lawyer Sherrilyn Ifill wrote of Matthew Williams:

Williams was a serious young man, especially about his money He'd reportedly saved $56 by the time of his death, a considerable sum for a black laborer in 1931. After his murder, no trace of the money was ever found. Williams did not drink or hang out with girls. He attended several churches, most often the John Wesley Methodist Church. His only frivolous indulgence seemed to be his hair, which he had touched up regularly at the Apex Hair salon on Isabelle street.

December 4, 1931 
The last time his family saw Matthew alive was in the afternoon of December 4, 1931. After playing with his cousins, Matthew announced to his aunt that he was going to work. By that evening, Daniel J. Elliott was dead and Matthew Williams was in the hospital.

The official story goes that Matthew Williams went to his employer's office, and the two began arguing over wages. At some point in the argument, Matthew Williams shot Daniel Elliott, then turned the gun on himself, unsuccessfully. Daniel Elliott’s son, James Elliott, was reported to have found the two, and using the gun fired two more shots at Matthew Williams, wounding him in the chest and leg.

The 1970's biography of Dorchester County waterman Joseph L. Sutton recounts a different story:''I heard a white man from down there was telling it.... He said, "He didn't shoot that man"...didn't nobody shoot him but his son and put it on this colored fellow. And the colored fellow has been workin' for this man, the man had some kind of lumberyard, I think. "Well," he say, "he'd been workin' for him ever since a boy.... We know he didn't shoot him. And they always gave him everything he wanted." And [the son] was spoiled! And he was the one that killed his father. And after they had lynched this fellow, well, they say the majority of them down there spoke of it, they said the same thing, said, "Wasn't nobody but his son." He killed his father and then shot this colored fellow so he wouldn't be there to be against him. Then he said this colored fellow had killed his father and he took the gun away from him and shoot him. NOTE: Again, Conjecture not based on any known evidence as no one was at the scene to account for this narrative from unknown gossip.
Williams was taken to Peninsula General Hospital (now Peninsula Regional Medical Center), where he was placed in the "Negro Ward" in a straitjacket, and his head bandaged so that he could not see.

Lynching 
What happened next was described by one Mr. Howard A. Nelson, a light-skinned man of color visiting from Philadelphia. His account from the Baltimore Afro-American:

I Arrived at Salisbury Thursday afternoon on a business trip. Early Friday I went to Princess Anne and returned late in the afternoon. I was standing talking to an acquaintance on Main Street about the killing of that man Elliot, when I noticed a group of men milling about the front of the town paper, the Salisbury Times. When I had finished my conversation, I went over to read the bulletin.I read the bulletin that was posted on the front of the building. It read: "Nigger is Dead. The nigger who murdered Mr. Elliot, a prominent citizen, has been reported as being dead."While I was reading this, a white man who was standing by mistook me for one of them and said, "Ain't that a damn shame that nigger died so soon. There was going to be some fun here tonight." Just about that time another bulletin was posted. It read: "The statement made by officials that the Negro was dead is false. A message just received says that he is improving."The men stood there for about five minutes. They stood talking in groups; more persons read that bulletin, and the crowd grew ever so thick. Almost like an explosion, some one yelled, "Let's go to the hospital and get this nigger and lynch him."Almost as though it was a military command, the crowd started toward the hospital. I followed along to see what was going to happen.The white man who was walking alongside of me said: "It's going to be good to see that nigger swing."When we arrived at the hospital, there was some man who asked the mob not to bother Williams. he crowd started to curse and swear and then a man said to be Dr. Dix [sic] came outside and asked the men to be quiet as there were many dangerously ill persons in the hospital. By that time a group of men - just how many I don't know - had gotten in the hospital and seized Williams. The colored ward is on the first floor towards the rear of the building. Instead of carrying his body through the door, the men threw him out of the first floor window to a large group of men. Williams had on the regulation hospital gown and his head was swathed in bandages which covered his eyes and his feet were bare.Seemingly in a semi-conscious condition, the fellow was dragged to the court house lawn...The following is from the edition of December 5 of the Baltimore Post:The Negro was dragged from, a hospital cot about 8p.m. and hanged to a limb of a tree in the courthouse square by a mob of more than 2000 persons.Later the body was dragged a quarter of a mile through the business section to a Negro subdivision, saturated with 40 gallons of gasoline and burned.The size of the mob was further corroborated in a report by The Baltimore SunMore than 2,000 persons, most of them members of the mob which had witnessed the hanging, but many new recruits, grouped around the pyre. They did not disperse until the last flame had flickered out.Sometime the following year, the Baltimore Afro-American received an account from an unidentified eyewitness to the murder of Matthew Williams:"First they dragged him to the courthouse square and hanged him, then they cut him down, tied the rope to the back of an auto, and dragged him to the Negro section of the town. Then they got about 40 or 50 gallons of gasoline, but before they threw this gas over him, they cut off his fingers and toes, threw them on the porches and in the yards of the colored people's homes, shouting these remarks, that they (the colored people) could make 'nigger' sandwiches out of them. Then they threw the gas over him, set a match to him, and while the human torch burned, they passed booze around, drinking and shouting...."

A second victim 
In the days following Matthew Williams murder, a second victim of mob violence was found in Salisbury. This from the edition of December 12, 1931 of the Baltimore Afro-American:With the lust for blood still running high in this mob-ridden community, the dead body of an unidentified man was found badly mutilated and slashed early morning. There are many mysterious elements surrounding the man's death. The identity and finding of the man's body at College Avenue and Railroad Streets has caused beliefs and rumors that the man was attacked and fatally injured by a group of blood-thirsty whites who were out to get any unprotected colored person seen on the streets Saturday night.It was learned that a telephone call was sent to police officials early Sunday morning stating that the body of a man could be found at the location which is near the dividing lines of the white and colored residential sections. The sender of the call refused to disclose his identity. Examination of the body by Afro-American reporters showed that the man's skull was fractured on the right side and the entire left side of his face was also crushed. On the right side there was a long, deep gash along the templar region, similar to a wound inflicted by a heavy sharp instrument. Rigor mortis had set in, with the man's arms lifted as though to ward off a blow. No bullet wounds could be found on the body nor the head, which was covered with blood. The wound on the head was two inches deep and about six inches long.Near the body was a half of a ham which was wrapped in brown paper, and a piece of bacon. It is believed that the man went to a store Saturday night after officials of the city had advised all colored citizens to stay off the bstreet. It is believed that while he was marketing, he was set upon by a group of whites who badly wounded him and carried him to the spot where he was found. No witnesses to the crime could be found.

Aftermath 
Despite the size of the mob and the preponderance of eye-witnesses, no one was ever identified or prosecuted for the lynching of Matthew Williams. After a year long probe by MD. State Attorney General William Preston Lane at the behest of Governor Albert Ritchie, it was concluded (as reported in the Baltimore Post on March 19, 1932) that:The report late yesterday by the Wicomico County grand jury that it had found "absolutely no evidence that can remotely connect anyone with the instigation or perpetration of the murder" of Matthew Williams, Negro, on Dec. 4th constitutes the final chapter in the story, Mr. Lane said."I have decided to make no comment on the jury's report," the Attorney General said. "The jury examined 128 witnesses. After considering their testimony, it reports that it can find  'absolutely' no evidence to connect, even 'remotely', anyone with the crime. The grand jury, under the laws of our state, is supreme within its territory. I believe no comment from me is necessary."

Legacy 
Matthew Williams one of three lynchings that took place in Salisbury, Maryland. The others were an unknown victim in the days following William's murder, and Garfield King in May 1898.

He was one of seven known lynchings on the Eastern Shore of Maryland, and one of 29 recorded in the state of Maryland.

References

External links
 Segment on Williams 5:27-17:54.

1931 deaths
1931 murders in the United States
Lynching deaths in Maryland
Murdered African-American people
People from Salisbury, Maryland